AerOasis S.A. was a startup airline based in El Dorado International Airport, founded in 2006 in Colombia founded by the Cortazar Family, which would have started operations in 2012.

History
LAN Airlines wanted to expand into Colombia, so in 2006, AerOasis was legally established at Section 33 from GEPA, with the support of LAN. The airline would have been a subsidiary of the LATAM Airlines Group in 2012, when it started operations. LAN started its expansion at the beginning of 2011 with AIRES purchase and was to finish when AerOasis started flying. However after AIRES' purchase, LAN changed plans and decided to stop the plan for AerOasis.

Destinations

The airline would have served the busiest routes in the country:

From Bogotá:
 Barranquilla - Ernesto Cortissoz International Airport
 Bucaramanga - Palonegro International Airport
 Cali - Alfonso Bonilla Aragón International Airport
 Cartagena - Rafael Núñez International Airport
 Cúcuta - Camilo Daza International Airport
 Leticia - Alfredo Vásquez Cobo International Airport
 Medellín - José María Córdova International Airport
 Montería - Los Garzones Airport
 Pereira - Matecaña International Airport
 San Andrés - Gustavo Rojas Pinilla International Airport
 Santa Marta - Simón Bolívar International Airport

From Medellín:
 Bogotá - El Dorado International Airport
 Cali - Alfonso Bonilla Aragón International Airport
 San Andrés - Gustavo Rojas Pinilla International Airport

From Cali:
 Bogotá - El Dorado International Airport
 Medellín - José María Córdova International Airport
 San Andrés - Gustavo Rojas Pinilla International Airport

From San Andrés:
 Bogotá - El Dorado International Airport
 Medellín - José María Córdova International Airport
 Cali - Alfonso Bonilla Aragón International Airport

Fleet
AerOasis operated the following aircraft (As of February 2011):

See also
List of defunct airlines of Colombia

External links
Official website

References

Defunct airlines of Colombia
Airlines established in 2006
Airlines disestablished in 2012